Molodyozhnoye is a municipal settlement in Kurortny District of the federal city of St. Petersburg, Russia, located on the Karelian Isthmus, on the northern shore of the Gulf of Finland. Population:  

Until the end of the Winter War in 1940, it was a part of Finland.

References

Municipal settlements under jurisdiction of Saint Petersburg
Karelian Isthmus
Kurortny District